A list of films produced in Montenegro. For an A-Z list see :Category:Montenegrin films

External links
 Montenegrin film at the Internet Movie Database

Montenegro

Films